The Bon Secours Memorial College of Nursing (BSMCON) is a private college located in Richmond, Virginia that offers a baccalaureate degree in nursing. The college is affiliated with the Catholic-based, nonprofit Bon Secours Health System (now Bon Secours Mercy Health).

History
BSMCON's history dates back to the formation of Richmond Memorial Hospital in 1957. Richmond Memorial Hospital School of Nursing opened in 1961 to serve as a source of nurses for the hospital. In 1993, a replacement hospital for Richmond Memorial was planned in collaboration with Bon Secours. The new hospital, Bon Secours Memorial Regional Medical Center, opened in 1998 and the school was renamed the Bon Secours Memorial School of Nursing.

In 2010, the school launched a four-year Bachelor of Science in nursing degree and became the Bon Secours Memorial College of Nursing.

Academics and Accreditation
BSMCON offers a pre-licensure Bachelor of Science in nursing program and a post-licensure online RN to BSN program for Registered Nurses who wish to earn a Bachelor of Science in nursing. Bon Secours Memorial College of Nursing is accredited by the Commission on Collegiate Nursing Education and holds institutional accreditation with the Accrediting Bureau of Health Education Schools. The college is approved to operate by the State Council of Higher Education in Virginia and the Virginia Board of Nursing. The BSN program includes the essential content recommended by the American Association of Colleges of Nursing.

References

2021-2022 College Catalog

External links
Official website

1961 establishments in Virginia
Education in Richmond, Virginia
Educational institutions established in 1961
Nursing schools in Virginia
Private universities and colleges in Virginia